Shir-e Mard or Shir Mard may refer to:
 Shir-e Mard, Bushehr
 Shir Mard, Chaharmahal and Bakhtiari
 Shir Mard, Fars
 Shir Mard, West Azerbaijan